Višegradska Banja is a village in the municipality of Višegrad, Bosnia and Herzegovina.

History

References

Populated places in Višegrad
Spa towns